Hello Goodbye is a 2008 French language romantic-dramedy film directed by Graham Guit. The film stars Gérard Depardieu and Fanny Ardant. The film is set in both Israel and France and follows the life of a Jewish couple who try to discover their true identity, their roots and the meaning of being Jewish.

Cast 
 Fanny Ardant : Gisèle
 Gérard Depardieu : Alain Gaash
 Jean Benguigui : Simon Gash
 Manu Payet : Shapiro
 Gilles Gaston-Dreyfus : Siletsky
 Lior Ashkenazi : Yossi
 Sasson Gabai : Police chief
 Jean-Michel Lahmi : Saint-Alban
 Muriel Combeau : Mme Saint-Alban
 Clémentine Poidatz : Gladys
 Julien Baumgartner : Nicolas
 Françoise Christophe : Alain's mother
 Claudine Baschet : Grandmother
 Jean-François Elberg : Monsieur Sapin
 Alix de Konopka : Mme Gash 
 Jean-Claude Jay : Alain's father
 Jacques Herlin : Uncle Albert

External links

French romantic comedy-drama films
2008 films
Films about Jews and Judaism
Films set in Israel
2000s French films